Ludwig Stickelberger (18 May 1850 – 11 April 1936) was a Swiss mathematician who made important contributions to linear algebra (theory of elementary divisors) and algebraic number theory (Stickelberger relation in the theory of cyclotomic fields).

Short biography
Stickelberger was born in Buch in the canton of Schaffhausen into a family of a pastor. He graduated from a gymnasium in 1867 and studied next in the University of Heidelberg. In 1874 he received a doctorate in Berlin under the direction of Karl Weierstrass for his work on the transformation of quadratic forms to a diagonal form. In the same year, he obtained his Habilitation from Polytechnicum in Zurich (now ETH Zurich). In 1879 he became an extraordinary professor in the Albert Ludwigs University of Freiburg. From 1896 to 1919 he worked there as a full professor, and from 1919 until his return to Basel in 1924 he held the title of a distinguished professor ("ordentlicher Honorarprofessor"). He was married in 1895, but his wife and son both died in 1918. Stickelberger died on 11 April 1936 and was buried next to his wife and son in Freiburg.

Mathematical contributions
Stickelberger's obituary lists the total of 14 publications: his thesis (in Latin), 
8 further papers that he authored which appeared during his lifetime, 4 joint papers with Georg Frobenius and a posthumously published paper written circa 1915. Despite this modest output, he is characterized there as "one of the sharpest among the pupils of Weierstrass" and a "mathematician of high rank". Stickelberger's thesis and several later papers streamline and complete earlier investigations of various authors, in a direct and elegant way.

Linear algebra
Stickelberger's work on the classification of pairs of bilinear and quadratic forms filled in important gaps in the theory earlier developed by Weierstrass and Darboux. Augmented with the contemporaneous work of Frobenius, it set the theory of elementary divisors upon a rigorous foundation. An important 1878 paper of Stickelberger and Frobenius gave the first complete treatment of the classification of finitely generated abelian groups and sketched the relation with the theory of modules that had just been developed by Dedekind.

Number theory
Three joint papers with Frobenius deal with the theory of elliptic functions. Today Stickelberger's name is most closely associated with his 1890 paper that established the Stickelberger relation for cyclotomic Gaussian sums. This generalized earlier work of Jacobi and Kummer and was later used by Hilbert in his formulation of the reciprocity laws in algebraic number fields. The Stickelberger relation also yields information about the structure of the class group of a cyclotomic field as a module over its abelian Galois group (cf Iwasawa theory).

References
Lothar Heffter, Ludwig Stickelberger, Jahresbericht der Deutschen Matematische Vereinigung, XLVII (1937), pp. 79–86
 Ludwig Stickelberger, Ueber eine Verallgemeinerung der Kreistheilung, Mathematische Annalen 37 (1890), pp. 321–367

External links
 

Swiss mathematicians
Number theorists
19th-century Swiss mathematicians
1850 births
1936 deaths